The Dead Camel Mountains are a mountain range located in western Nevada in the United States. The Dead Camel mountains separate the Lahontan Reservoir from Fallon, Nevada. There are several small caves on the eastern slope of the mountains, one of which contains many pictographs left by the inhabitants of the area at the time of Lake Lahontan. This area also has some interesting tufa formations.

References 

Mountain ranges of Churchill County, Nevada
Mountain ranges of Nevada